The following is a list of game boards of the Parker Brothers/Hasbro board game Monopoly adhering to a particular theme or particular locale in the United States. Lists for other regions can be found here. The game is licensed in 103 countries and printed in 37 languages. It is estimated that more than 250 million Monopoly games have been sold and that the game has been played by billions people.

Historical 
1935 Classic Reproduction Edition

1935 Retro Series Edition

1935 Commemorative Edition

(50th) Anniversary Deluxe Edition

60th Anniversary Edition

70th Anniversary Edition

80th Anniversary Edition

85th Anniversary Edition

1936 Brown Box "New Edition" Edition

1936 Super Gold Edition

Original Board Special Designs or Packaging 

The Cat Voted #1 Edition

The Classic Edition

Franklin Mint Edition

Franklin Mint Collector's Edition

Giant Deluxe Edition

Hasbro Gaming Road Trip Edition

Library Classic Games Edition

Luxe Edition (Navy Blue & Gold, Black & Gold, White & Gold)

Nostalgia Wooden Box Edition (2001)

Onyx Limited Edition

Neon Edition

Platinum Edition (Barnes & Noble)

Retro Game Edition (Walmart)

Rustic Series Edition (Target)

Signature Token Edition

Silver Line Edition (Toys "R" Us)

Tin Car Case Edition (2001)

Token Madness Edition

Train Tin Collector's Edition

Vintage Game Collection Edition (Wooden Book Shelf)

Vintage Bookshelf Edition (Linen)

Zapped Edition

Numbers 
007 Edition

007: 50th Anniversary Edition (Skyfall)

007: James Bond Ultimate Collector's Edition

A 
Achievement Hunter Edition

AC/DC Collector's Edition

America Special Edition

American Chopper Edition (2006)

America's National Parks Edition (2005)

America's World War II Edition

Alaska Iditarod Edition

AMG 50th Anniversary Edition

Angry Birds Edition

Animal Crossing: New Horizons Edition (2021)

Animaniacs Edition

Ariel Edition

Assassin's Creed Edition

Assassin's Creed Syndicate Edition

Astronomy Edition

Attack on Titan Edition (2016)

Avalon Communications Edition (2001)

The Avengers (Marvel) Edition (2014)

The Avengers (Marvel) Edition (2018)

B 

Back to the Future Edition

Back to the Future Trilogy Edition

Bank of America Edition (Baseball)

Bank of America Toy Bank Edition

Bass Fishing Lakes Edition (2005)

Batman Edition (2006)

BBK Clinical Research and Development Edition (2007)

The Beatles Collector's Edition

The Beatles Yellow Submarine Edition

Beetlejuice Edition

Berkshire Hathaway Diamond Edition (2005)

Best Buy Corp. Edition (2002)

The Big Bang Theory Edition

The Big Friendly Giant Edition (BFG)

Black Panther Edition

BoJack Horseman Edition

Boutique Edition

Boy Scouts of America 95th Anniversary Edition

Boy Scouts of America 100th Anniversary Edition

Bratz Edition

Brave Edition

Britney Spears Edition (2023)

Belkin Edition (2006)

C 

California Centers Magazine Edition

California Centers Magazine Collector's Edition

Call of Duty: Black Ops Edition

Candy Crush Edition

Coraline Edition

Cat Lover's Edition

Cats vs. Dogs Edition

Cedar Point-opoly

Century of Flight: Aviation Edition

Championship Edition

Cheaters Edition

Cheerleading Edition

50th Anniversary Chevy Corvette Edition (2003)

ChileHeads Edition

Chocolateopoly Edition

Christmas Edition

A Christmas Story Edition (2007, 2008, 2009)

Chrysler Town & Country Road Trip Edition

Clemsonopoly (Clemson University Edition)

Coca-Cola Collector's Edition (1999)

Coca-Cola 125th Anniversary Collector's Edition

Coca-Cola Classic Ads Edition

Cornwell Quality Tools 95 Years Anniversary Edition

Corvette Edition

Corvette 50th Anniversary Collector's Edition

Crooks and Castles Collector's Edition

Cthulhu Edition

Cottage Grove Edition

D 

Davita Collector's Edition

DC Comics 1st Special Edition

D-Day Edition

Deadpool Edition

Deadpool Collector's Edition

Deluxe Edition (1995)

Deluxe Vintage 5-in-1 Edition

Despicable Me Edition

Despicable Me 2 Edition
Disney Cars 2 Edition

Disney "Celebrate the magic and memories of Disney Animation" Edition

Disney Chronicles of Narnia Edition

Disney Frozen II Edition

Disney The Lion King Edition
Disney Theme Park II Edition

Disney Theme Park (Pop-up Castle 2019) Edition

Disney/Pixar Edition (2005, 2007)

Disney Vacation Club Edition

Disney Villains Edition

My Disney Villains Edition

Dinosaur Edition

Doctor Who 50th Anniversary Edition

Doctor Who Edition

Doctor Who Villains Edition

The Dog Artist Edition

Dog Lover's Edition

Doraemon Edition

Dragon Ball Super Edition

Duel Masters Edition

Dale Earnhardt Edition (The first edition based on a person.)

E 
East Longmeadow Edition

80th Anniversary Edition

Electronic Banking Edition

Elvis 25th Anniversary Collector's Edition

Elvis 75th Anniversary Collector's Edition

Elvis Collector's Edition (2002)

Elvis Collector's Edition (2011)

Emergency Medical Services Edition

Empire Edition

ESPN Ultimate Sports Fan Edition

European Edition

F 

Fallout Edition

Fallout Edition (Hot Topic)

Family Guy Collector's Edition (2006, 2010)

Fantastic Four Collector's Edition

FAO Schwarz 150th Anniversary Edition

Fazzino World Edition

FedEx Edition

FedEx 2nd Edition

Firefighters Edition

Firefighters 2nd Alarm Edition

Firefighters 3rd Alarm Edition

Firefly Edition

Fisher Scientific Centennial Edition

Ford Edition

Ford 100th Anniversary Collector's Edition

Fortnite Edition (2018 - Blue Box)

Fortnite Edition (2018 - Purple Box)

Foxwoods Resort Casino Special Edition

Friends Edition

Futurama Edition

Future Electronics Collector's Edition

G 
Giant Edition (2012)

Game of Thrones Edition (2015, 2018)

Gamer Edition

Gamer Collector's Edition (GameStop)

Gamer: Mario Kart Edition

Gamer: Overwatch Edition

Gamer: Sonic the Hedgehog Edition

Garfield Collector's Edition

Ghostbusters Collector's Edition

G.I. Joe Collector's Edition
The Golden Girls Edition

Golf Signature Holes Edition

Glass Edition

Guardians of the Galaxy Vol. 2 Edition

GWopoly

H 

Halo Collector's Edition

Hallmark Channel Edition

Hard Rock Cafe Edition (2006, 2010)

Harley-Davidson 95th Anniversary Limited Collector's Edition

Harley-Davidson Legendary Bikes Edition

Harley-Davidson Live to Ride Edition

Heinz Edition

The Heirloom Edition

Here & Now: The World Edition Collector's Edition

Hello Kitty Collector's Edition

The Hobbit: An Unexpected Journey edition

The Hobbit motion picture trilogy edition

Hollywood Edition

Horse Lover's Edition

House Divided – about the U.S. Elections

HP Supply Chain Edition

Hull Edition

I 

Iditarod Edition

I Love Lucy Edition

I Love Lucy 50th Anniversary Collector's Edition

I Love Lucy California Here We Come Edition

Inflatable Edition

Indiana Jones Edition

Iron Mountain Edition

It Edition

It Edition (GameStop Exclusive)

J 

Jay and Silent Bob Strike Back Collector's Edition

John Wayne Collector's Edition

Joplin, Missouri Edition

Jurassic Park Edition

Jurassic World Edition (Solid Blue Front)

Jurassic World Edition (Three Claw Marks)

Juicy Couture Edition

Justice League of America Collector's Edition (1999, 2002)

K 

KISS-opoly

Klingon Collector's Edition

Klingon Limited Edition

L 

The Legend of Zelda Edition (GameStop)

Lilly Pulitzer Edition

Lilo & Stitch Edition (Hot Topic)

Limited Too Collector's Edition

Lionel Trains Collector's Edition - Postwar Era

Littlest Pet Shop Edition (2007, 2008)

Longest Game Ever

Looney Tunes Edition (1999)

Looney Tunes Collector's Edition (2003)

L.O.L. Surprise Edition

The Lord of the Rings Collector's Edition

The Lord of the Rings Trilogy Edition (2003, 2012)

Luxury Edition

M 

Major League Baseball Edition

Major League Baseball Collector's Edition

Margaritaville Deluxe Edition

Marvel Comics Collector's Edition (1999, 2012)

Marvel Super Heroes Edition

Mass Effect N7 Collector's Edition

Metallica Edition
M&M's Collector's Edition (2004, 2007, white rectangle ?)
Michael Graves Edition (Target)
Mayberry Edition

Metallica Collector's Edition

Millennials Edition

Millennium Edition (2000)

Millionaire Edition

Monopoly City Edition

Mountaineering Edition

Ms. Monopoly Edition

Muhammad Ali "The Greatest" Edition

The Muppets Collector's Edition

The Muppets Jim Henson's Collector's Edition

Mustang (Ford) Edition

Mustang (Ford) 40th Anniversary Edition (2004)

My American Idol Edition

My Fantasy Baseball Edition

My Hero Academia Edition

My Little Pony: Friendship Is Magic Edition

My Marvel Heroes Edition

My Monopoly Edition

My National Parks (2008)

My MLB Edition

My NBA Edition

My NFL Edition

My NHL Edition

N 
NASCAR 50th Anniversary Limited Collector's Edition

NASCAR Collector's Edition

NASCAR Official Collector's Edition
National Parks (1998)

National Parks (2001)

National Parks (2010)

National Parks (2014)

NFL Collector's Edotopm

NFL Limited 1999 Grid Iron Edition
NHL Edition (2001)

NHL Collector's Edition

NHL Original Six Edition (2001)

NHL Original Six Edition (2008)

Night Sky Edition

Nightmare Before Christmas Edition

Nightmare Before Christmas: Collector's Edition

Nightmare Before Christmas: Hot Topic Exclusive Edition

Nightmare Before Christmas: 25 Years Edition

Nintendo Collector's Edition (GameStop)

O 

The Office Collector's Edition

Offshore Engineering 40th Anniversary Collector's Edition

Olympic Games Edition (London 2012)

Option One Mortgage Corporation Limited Edition

P 

Peanuts Edition

Pedigree Dog Lover's Edition

Phineas & Ferb Edition (2012)

Phenix City, Alabama Edition (2021)

Pirates of the Caribbean: On Stranger Tides Collector's Edition

Pirates of the Caribbean: Trilogy Edition

Pirates of the Caribbean: Ultimate Edition

Pixar Edition

Pizza Edition

Playmaster Edition

Planet Earth Edition

Planet of the Apes Retro Art Edition

Pokémon Kanto Edition (2014)

Pokémon Johto Edition (2016)

Pokémon Go Edition

Pottery Barn Deluxe Edition

Pottery Barn Heirloom Edition

Premier Communities Edition

Prologis Industrial Real Estate Edition

Q 

Queen Monopoly

QVC

R 

Rudolph the Red-Nosed Reindeer Collector's Edition

The Ren & Stimpy Edition

The Ren & Stimpy: Memories Edition

Revolution Edition

RIM (BlackBerry) 25th Anniversary Edition

Rick and Morty Edition

Road Trip Edition

Rolling Stones Collector's Edition

Rudolph the Red-Nosed Reindeer Collector's Edition (2005, 2012)

Rugrats Edition

Rustic Cuff Commemorative Edition

Roblox: 2022 Edition

S 

Schnucksopoly

Scooby-Doo 50th Anniversary Edition

Scooby-Doo Collector's Edition

Scooby-Doo Fright Fest Edition

SeaWorld Edition

Seattle Mariners Wildlife Conservation Edition

Seinfeld Collector's Edition

Sephora Edition

Sesame Street 35 Years Edition

Sheraton Edition

Shrek Collector's Edition

Sigma Chi Limited Edition

The Simpsons Electronic Banking Edition

The Simpsons: Treehouse of Horror Edition

Skylanders Edition

The Smurfs Collector's Edition

Snap-on Collector's Edition

Socialism Edition

South Park Collector's Edition

Space (2020)

Space Jam: A New Legacy Edition

Spider-Man Edition

Spider-Man Collector's Edition (2002, 2012)

Star Trek Continuum Edition

Star Wars 40th Anniversary Special Edition

Star Wars Edition (2018)

Star Wars Classic Trilogy Edition

Star Wars Episode 1 Edition

Star Wars Saga Edition

Star Wars Limited Collector's Edition

Star Wars Open and Play Edition

Star Wars The Clone Wars Edition

Star Wars The Complete Saga Edition

Star Wars: The Force Awakens edition

Steven Universe Edition

Stranger Things Edition

Stranger Things Collector's Edition

Sun-Maid Edition

STV 100 Years Edition

Sun-Maid Collector's Edition

Sunterra Edition

Super Electronic Banking

Super Mario Celebration!

Super Mario Bros. Collector's Edition

Superman Returns Collector's Edition

Supernatural Edition

Surfing Edition

T 

Target Edition

Team Fortress 2 Edition

Teenage Mutant Ninja Turtles Edition

Teenage Mutant Ninja Turtles Collector's Edition

The Three Stooges Collector's Edition

Times Square Edition (Toys "R" Us)

Thunderbird 50th Anniversary Edition (Ford)

Tommy Bahama 20th Anniversary Edition

Transformers Deluxe Collector's Edition

Transformers Edition

Tropical Tycoon DVD Game Edition

Trump Entertainment Resorts Collector's Edition

Toy Story Edition

U 

U-Build Edition

Ultimate Banking Edition

Uncharted Edition

Unicorns vs. Llamas Edition

UPS First Edition

U.S. Air Force Edition

U.S. Army Edition

U.S. Navy Edition

U.S. Coast Guard Edition

USA Greatest Cities Edition

United Way of Massachusetts Bay Boston Community Limited Edition

V 

Van Gogh Official Museum Edition

Venetian, Palazzo Edition (Las Vegas)

Vintage Game Collection Edition

Voice Banking Edition

Volkswagen Classic Collector's Edition

W 
The Walking Dead Edition

The Walking Dead Survival Edition

Warhammer 40,000 Edition

The Wizard of Oz 75th Anniversary Collector's Edition

The Wizard of Oz Collector's Edition (2008)
World Cup 2006 Edition

World Edition

World of Warcraft Collector's Edition

WWE Edition

X 

X-Men Collector's Edition

Y 

Yu-Gi-Oh! Edition

Z 

Zappos.com Collector's Edition

USA (Spanish language)

USA (French translation)

Cities 

Antigo, Wisconsin, issued in 2020

Atlanta Edition (1994, 1995)

Anderson County, Kentucky Anderson-Opoly 2020 Limited Edition featuring businesses from Lawrenceburg & Anderson County, Kentucky.

Atlantic City (standard edition). First issued by Parker Brothers in 1935. Mega Edition featuring more Atlantic City streets released in 2006.

Baltimore Edition (1997)

Bar Harbor, Maine, issued unknown

Boston – two editions: Boston, issued in 1994, 1995, 1996 and Boston (Historic) issued in 1998.

Cambridge Edition (2020; produced by Top Trumps USA; not to be confused with the Cambridge Edition in England)

Cedar Rapids, Iowa, issued unknown

Charlotte issued in 1997.

Cincinnati, issued in 1998.

Dana Point, issued in 1996.

Denver, issued in 1996

Detroit, issued in 1997.

Fond du Lac, Wisconsin, issued in 2007.

Fox Cities, Wisconsin, issued in 2003.

Frankfort, Kentucky Year Unknown. Frankfort-Opoly (Kentucky Distilled Frankfort-Opoly).  A game featuring Frankfort & Franklin County, Kentucky.

Grand Rapids, issued in 2004.

Green Bay, issued in 2000.

Greenfield, Massachusetts, issued in 2005

Greenwich Edition (2020; produced by Top Trumps USA)

Houma, Louisiana, issued in 2006

Jacksonville Edition (2002)

Kansas City Edition (1997)

La Jolla Edition (1994)

Las Vegas Edition (1997, 2000)

Las Vegas Fabulous Edition

Los Angeles Edition (1996)

Louisville, Kentucky Year Unknown. Louisville-Opoly.  A game celebrating Derby City.

Manitowoc Edition (2000)

Menomonie, Wisconsin, issued in 2004 (Menomonopoly).

Minneapolis, Saint Paul (Twin Cities Edition), issued 1997.

Moberly, Missouri Unknown issue date.

Orlando, issued in 1997.

Pittsburgh, issued in 1996.

Port Arthur, Texas (2013)

Rochester (issue date unknown)

San Francisco Historic Edition (1998)

Seattle Edition (1997)

Sheboygan Edition (2001)

Shelbyville, Kentucky Shelbyville-Opoly (2021).  A fun game celebrating Shelbyville, Kentucky (in Shelby County, Kentucky).

St. Louis Edition (1997)

Twin Cities Edition (1997)

Teaneck, New Jersey, 10th ed. issued in 2012.

Tullahoma, Tennessee Edition (unknown, 2019)

Utica, New York, issued 2018.

Wilkes-Barre, issued 2012.

Worcester Edition (2021; produced by Top Trumps USA)

States 

Arizona, issued in 1998.

Florida, issued in 1998.

Hawaii, issued in 1996.

Maine, issued in 1999.

Oregon, issued in 1998.

Rhode Island, issued in 1998.

Texas, issued in 1999, also available in a container in the shape of the state.

Utah, issued in 1998.

Territories 

Puerto Rico, issued in 2005.

Regions 

Napa Valley, California, issued in 1997.

New England, issued in 2001.

Palos Verdes, issued in 2007. Palos Verdes Peninsula Chamber of Commerce |

Professional sports teams 
Boston Bruins Stanley Cup Champions (2011)

Boston Celtics Collector's Edition (2006)

Boston Red Sox Collector's Edition (2000, 2006, 2008)

Boston Red Sox World Series Champions Collector's Edition (2004, 2007)

Chicago Bears Collector's Edition (2005, 2008)

Chicago Blackhawks Collector's Edition (2010)

Chicago Cubs Collector's Edition (2002)

Chicago White Sox World Series Collector's Edition (2005)

Cleveland Browns Edition (1999)

Dallas Cowboys Collector's Edition (2003, 2008)

Denver Broncos Commemorative Super Bowl Edition (XXXII)

Detroit Pistons 50 Seasons Collector's Edition

Detroit Red Wings Collector's Edition

Detroit Tigers Collector's Edition (2006)

Green Bay Packers Collector's Edition (2000, 2003)

Houston Astros Edition (2005)

Indianapolis Colts Super Bowl Champions Collector's Edition (XLI)

Los Angeles Lakers Collector's Edition

Los Angeles Lakers Legends Edition

Los Angeles Dodgers Collector's Edition (2000, 2018)

Miami Dolphins Collector's Edition (2004)

Minnesota Vikings Collector's Edition (2005)

Minnesota Wild Collector's Edition (2006)

New England Patriots Collector's Edition (2003, 2004, 2008)

New Orleans Saints Super Bowl Collector's Edition (XLIV)

New York Giants Collector's Edition (2003, 2006)

New York Giants Super Bowl Champions Edition (XLII)

New York Jets Collector's Edition (2004)

New York Mets Collector's Edition (2001, 2005, 2006 Blue or Orange)

New York Yankees Collector's Edition (2000, 2001, 2006 Light or Dark Blue)

New York Yankees The Century's Team Edition

Oakland Raiders Collector's Edition (2004, 2008)

Philadelphia Eagles Collector's Edition (2003)

Philadelphia Phillies World Series Champions Collector's Edition (2008)

Pittsburgh Steelers Collector's Edition (2004)

Pittsburgh Steelers Super Bowl Champions Edition (XL)

San Antonio Spurs Collector's Edition

San Francisco Giants Collector's Edition (2003)

Seattle Mariners Collector's Edition (2001)

Seattle Mariners 25th Anniversary Collector's Edition (2002)

St. Louis Cardinals Collector's Edition (2001)

St. Louis Cardinals World Series Champions Collector's Edition (2006)

St. Louis Rams Super Bowl Champions Edition (XXXIV)

Washington Redskins Collector's Edition

Universities 
Florida State University Edition (1998)

Ohio State University Edition (1997)

University of Kansas Edition (1998)

University of Tennessee Edition (1998)

University of Washington Edition (1998)

See also 
 Late for the Sky Production Company - produces, manufactures, and distributes Monopoly-inspired games in the U.S.

References

External links 
 Over 1700 Monopoly versions, updated continuously (some unofficial)
 Database of street names in local editions
 Monopoly games and places from around the world
 Rich Man series review (Chinese)
 Bucharest Version: Detailed article
 MONOPOLY around the World and a contact for different MONOPOLY boards
 Nearly one hundred monopoly boards listed at MonopolyBoards.Info

Monopoly (game)
Monopoly
Monopoly